Lloyd Jones (born September 23, 1937) is an American politician who served as a member of the Alaska Senate from 1987 and 1992. He was succeeded in office by Robin L. Taylor.

Early life and education 
He was born in Elma, Washington and attended J. M. Weatherwax High School in Aberdeen, Washington. He earned a bachelor's degree from the University of Washington.

Career 
A Republican, Jones represented District A in the Alaska Senate between 1987 and 1992. Jones had previously served on the Petersburg, Alaska City Council. Jones also worked in the logging business.

Personal life 
Jones was married to Jan Faiks, who served in the Alaska Senate from 1982 to 1990.

References

1937 births
Living people
University of Washington alumni
People from Elma, Washington
Businesspeople from Alaska
Alaska city council members
Republican Party Alaska state senators
People from Petersburg Borough, Alaska